Syarhey Kavalchuk (born 9 October 1978) is a retired Belarusian professional footballer. His latest club was Krumkachy Minsk in 2015.

Honours
Dinamo Minsk
Belarusian Premier League champion: 1997
Belarusian Cup winner: 2002–03
Shakhtyor Soligorsk
Belarusian Premier League champion: 2005

External links

1978 births
Living people
Belarusian footballers
Belarusian expatriate footballers
Expatriate footballers in Russia
Belarus international footballers
Belarusian Premier League players
FC Dinamo Minsk players
FC Shakhtyor Soligorsk players
FC SKA-Khabarovsk players
FC Slavia Mozyr players
FC Smorgon players
FC Krumkachy Minsk players
Association football defenders